The  is a political party in Japan that was established in 1996. Since its reformation and name change in 1996, it has advocated pacifism and defined itself as a social-democratic party.

The party was refounded in January 1996 by the majority of legislators of the former Japan Socialist Party, which was largest opposition party in the 1955 System; however, most of the legislators joined the Democratic Party of Japan after that. Five leftist legislators who did not join the SDP formed the New Socialist Party, which lost all its seats in the following elections. The SDP enjoyed a short period of government participation from 1993 to 1994 as part of the Hosokawa Cabinet and later formed a coalition government with the Liberal Democratic Party under 81st Prime Minister Tomiichi Murayama of the JSP from 1994 to January 1996. The SDP was part of ruling coalitions between January and November 1996 (First Hashimoto Cabinet) and from 2009 to 2010 (Hatoyama Cabinet).

In the 2019 Japanese House of Councillors election, the party won four representatives in the National Diet, two in the lower house and two in the upper house. In November 2020, the party entered into a merger agreement with the Constitutional Democratic Party. The party president Mizuho Fukushima held her seat, and the party cleared the minimum two percent voter share to maintain its legal political party status, in the 2022 House of Councillors elections.

History

Before 2000 

In 1995, the former Japan Socialist Party (JSP) was in a deep crisis, as it faced criticisms on entering a coalition with its longtime rival LDP, and core policy changes. Aiming at saving the party, the leadership of JSP decided to dissolve the party and to establish a new social democratic party. In January 1996, such a new party, the Social Democratic Party, was established along with the dissolution of JSP. De jure, JSP changed its name to the Social Democratic Party (SDP) as an interim party for forming a new party, and a movement for transforming the SDP into a new social-democratic and liberal party was unsuccessful. Under Murayama's successor Ryūtarō Hashimoto (LDP), the SDP remained part of the ruling coalition. Long before the disappointing result in the 1996 Japanese general election, the party lost the majority of its members of the House of Representatives, mainly to predecessors of the Democratic Party of Japan (DPJ) that was formed in 1996, but also some to the NFP and other opposition parties. After its electoral defeat in the 1996 general election when it lost another 15 of its remaining 30 seats in the lower house, the SDP left the ruling coalition which it had entered as the second largest force in Japanese politics as a minor party.

2000s–2010s 
The SDP won six seats in the 2003 Japanese general election, compared with 18 seats in the previous 2000 Japanese general election. Its motives against the Self-Defense Forces have reverted into abolishing it in the long term, returning into its opposition against the force it had applied in the 1950s. Doi had been the leader since 1996, but she resigned in 2003, taking responsibility for the election losses. Mizuho Fukushima was elected as the new party leader in November 2003. In the 2004 Japanese House of Councillors election, the SDP won only two seats, having five seats in the House of Councillors and six seats in the House of Representatives. In 2006, the party unexpectedly gained the governorship of the Shiga Prefecture. In the 2009 Japanese general election, the DPJ made large gains and the SDP maintained its base of 7 seats in the, becoming a junior partner in a new government coalition; however, disagreements over the issue of the Futenma base led to the sacking of Fukushima from the cabinet on 28 May and the SDP subsequently voted to leave the ruling coalition.

As of October 2010, the SDP had six members in the House of Representatives and four members in the House of Councillors. Following the 2012 Japanese general election, the party retained only six seats in the whole of the Diet, two in the House of Representatives and four in the House of Councillors. The count lowered to five seats in 2013. In 2013, the party's headquarters in Nagatacho, where the party's predecessor the JSP had moved in 1964, were demolished. The headquarters moved to a smaller office in Nagatacho.

During the nomination period of the 2016 Japanese House of Councillors election, the party signed an agreement with the Democratic, Communist and People's Life parties to field a jointly-endorsed candidate in each of the 32 districts in which only one seat is contested, thereby uniting in an attempt to take control of the House from the LDP/Komeito coalition. The party had two Councillors up for re-election and fielded a total of 11 candidates in the election, 4 in single and multi-member districts and 7 in the 48-seat national proportional representation block.

In the 2017 Japanese general election, the party managed to hold to its two seats it had prior to the election. Tadatomo Yoshida declined to run for re-election when his term expired in January 2018. Seiji Mataichi was elected unopposed in the ensuing leadership election and took office on 25 February 2018.

On 14 November 2020, the party voted to agree to a merger arrangement with the Constitutional Democratic Party of Japan (CDP), allowing members to leave the SDP and join the latter party. The majority of the party supported the agreement and joined the CDP; however, party leader Fukushima herself was opposed to the merger agreement and remains a member of the Social Democratic Party.

Policies 

Party policies include:
 Defend Article 9 of the Constitution of Japan and declare cities defenseless so that they will not resist in the event of invasion.
 Advocate a significant increase in the scope of social welfare such as healthcare, pensions, social security and disability care.
 Opposition to neoliberalism and neoconservatism.
 Complete disarmament of Japan in accordance with pacifist principles. The Japanese Self-Defense Force will be replaced with a force dedicated to disaster relief and foreign aid.
 Cancellation of the United States–Japan military alliance, dismantling of United States bases in Japan and replacing it with a Treaty of Friendship.
 Opposition to Japan's involvement in supporting the United States in the war against terror through refueling of American warships in the Indian Ocean.
 Introduction of an environmental carbon tax.
 Significant increase in the scope of wildlife protection legislation, increasing the number of protected species and setting up of protection zones.
 Transition from a mass-production/mass-consumption society to a sustainable society in coexistence with nature.
 Clampdown on harmful chemicals, e.g. restriction on use of agricultural chemicals, ban on asbestos, tackling dioxin and soil pollutants.
 Increased investment in public transport, encouraging a switch from road to rail and from petrol powered buses to hybrids, electric vehicles and light rail transit.
 Opposition to nuclear power and proposal of a gradual switch to wind energy as the nation's base energy source.
 Abolition of the death penalty.
 Opposition to water privatization.
 Supports feminist politics.
 Legalization of same-sex marriage.

Leaders

Election results

House of Representatives

House of Councillors

Current Diet members

House of Representatives 
 Kunio Arakaki (Okinawa-2nd)

House of Councillors 
Up for re-election in 2022
 Mizuho Fukushima (National PR)

See also 
 Democratic Party of Japan
 Democratic Socialist Party (Japan)
 Japan Socialist Party
 Leftist Socialist Party of Japan
 List of political parties in Japan
 Politics of Japan
 Rightist Socialist Party of Japan
 Itsurō Sakisaka

Notes

References

External links 

 Official website

Full member parties of the Socialist International
Centre-left parties in Asia
Environmentalism in Japan
Feminist parties in Asia
Left-wing parties in Asia
Pacifism in Japan
Pacifist parties
Political parties established in 1996
Progressive parties in Japan
Social democracy in Asia
Social democratic parties in Japan
Democratic socialist parties in Asia
1996 establishments in Japan